The discography of American singer Gladys Knight as a solo artist consists of eleven studio albums and eighteen singles.

Studio albums

Singles

 Notes
 Did not chart on the Hot R&B/Hip-Hop Songs charts (Billboard rules at the time prevented album cuts from charting). Chart peak listed represents the Hot R&B/Hip-Hop Airplay chart.

See also
Gladys Knight & the Pips discography

References

Discographies of American artists